Catcher in the Rye (麦田守望者 Maitian shouwangzhe) is considered to be one of China's earliest punk rock bands, formed in 1994. The band features Xiao Wei as lead vocalist, and the band's first (self-titled) album was released in 1998.

References

Chinese rock music groups